Konstantinos Kanellopoulos was a Greek Navy officer who reached the rank of rear admiral.

He was born in 1872, the nephew of the notable naval officer and educator Ilias Kanellopoulos. He joined the Royal Hellenic Navy as an ensign in 1890, and fought in the Greco-Turkish War of 1897 and the Balkan Wars of 1912–13. He retired with the rank of rear admiral on 10/23 May 1920.

His older brother, Filippos, also became a naval officer and reached the rank of vice admiral.

References

1872 births
20th-century deaths
19th-century Greek military personnel
20th-century Greek military personnel
Greek military personnel of the Balkan Wars
Greek military personnel of the Greco-Turkish War (1897)
Hellenic Navy admirals